Sálvio Dino (5 June 1932 – 24 August 2020) was a Brazilian writer and politician who served as a Congressman. 

He died from complications of COVID-19 during the COVID-19 pandemic in Brazil.

References

1932 births
2020 deaths
National Renewal Alliance politicians
Democrats (Brazil) politicians
People from Maranhão
Members of the Legislative Assembly of Maranhão
Deaths from the COVID-19 pandemic in Maranhão